Empress Ju (鞠皇后, personal name unknown) was an empress of the short-lived state of Qin at the end of the Chinese dynasty Sui Dynasty.  Her husband was the state's founder Xue Ju (Emperor Wu).

Little is known about her.  When Xue Ju first rose against Sui rule in summer 617 and claimed the title of "Hegemonic Prince of Western Qin" (西秦霸王), there was no record of his creating her any titles.  In fall 617, when Xue Ju claimed the title Emperor of Qin, he created her empress.  It is not known whether his crown prince Xue Rengao or the only other son of his whose name was recorded in history, Xue Renyue (薛仁越), was her son or not.

Empress Ju was said to be cruel.  She liked to whip and batter her servants, and when those who could not endure her beating would roll in pain on the ground, she would bury their feet in dirt so that they would be immobile, and resume the beating.  It was said that this was part of the reason why Xue Ju was unable to get as many people to follow him as he hoped.

Xue Ju, while initially successful against the forces of Tang Dynasty, which had seized most of modern Shaanxi and who had plans to attack the Tang capital Chang'an, died in fall 618.  Xue Rengao inherited the title of emperor, but three months later was defeated by and forced to surrender to the Tang general Li Shimin (the future Emperor Taizong).  Xue Rengao was executed, but his brothers and his generals were largely spared.  No reference was made, however, to the fate of Empress Ju, and there was no historical record indicating whether Xue Rengao honored her as empress dowager.

Chinese empresses
Sui dynasty people
Tang dynasty people